Marcel Heldmann (born 9 December 1966) is a retired Swiss football midfielder.

While at FC Aarau he was part of the side that won the Swiss national title in 1992–93.

References

1966 births
Living people
Swiss men's footballers
FC Wettingen players
FC Aarau players
FC Zürich players
FC Baden players
FC Wangen bei Olten players
Switzerland international footballers
Association football midfielders
People from Aarau
Sportspeople from Aargau